The following is a list of notable people from Latakia and ancient Laodicea.

Ancient
Anatolius of Laodicea
Apollinaris of Laodicea
Eusebius of Laodicea
Philonides of Laodicea
Themison of Laodicea

Modern
Jacques Saadé, billionaire born to a family originally from Latakia
Rodolphe Saadé، billionaire with a net worth estimate at $10 billion.
Rasha Abbas, author and journalist
Hafez al-Assad, former president of Syria
Bashar Al-Asad, current president of Syria
Adunis, poet
Hasan Alkhayer, poet and politician
Yusuf Yasin, an advisor to King Abdulaziz
Hanna Mina, novelist
Izz ad-Din al-Qassam, sheikh and a rebel leader in Palestine
Michel Kilo, writer and activist
Aref Dalila, economist and activist
Badawi al-Jabal, poet
Mustafa Hamsho, professional boxer
Zaki al-Arsuzi, politician and founder of Baath Party
 Maram al-Masri, poet
 Yusuf Yasin, politician and journalist

Latakia